Coleophora ardesicola is a moth of the family Coleophoridae that can be found in such European countries as Portugal and Spain, and into North Africa.

References

External links

afrohispana
Moths of Africa
Moths of Europe
Moths described in 1982